The third cabinet of Kalevi Sorsa was the 62nd government of Finland. The majority government lasted from 19 February 1982 to 6 May 1983. The cabinet's prime minister was Kalevi Sorsa. The Finnish People's Democratic League disapproved of the government's decision to raise the country's defence budget, which led to a governmental crisis, which culminated in the FPDL being forced to resign from the government by the prime minister on 31 December 1982. As a result of the change, the Liberal People's Party joined the coalition and, together with the rest of the previous government, formed the Sorsa IIIb Cabinet.

Ministers 

|}

References 

Sorsa
1982 establishments in Finland
1983 disestablishments in Finland
Cabinets established in 1982
Cabinets disestablished in 1983